"Bad Fog of Loneliness" is a song written by Canadian singer-songwriter Neil Young, recorded in 1971 but not released until 2007 on the album Live at Massey Hall 1971, in 2009 on The Archives Vol. 1 1963-1972 and in 2013 on Live at the Cellar Door. It also appeared on Young's live "Red Rocks" DVD released in 2000.

In the introduction to the Live at Massey Hall version, Young explains that he originally intended to perform the song on the Johnny Cash Show but his appearance was canceled. By the time he was rescheduled to appear in February 1971, he decided that the song was "too old" and would perform something else instead (he eventually did two other brand new songs, "The Needle and the Damage Done" and "Journey Through the Past").

A studio version of the song also appears on The Archives Vol. 1, featuring Ben Keith on pedal steel guitar, Tim Drummond on bass guitar, Kenny Buttrey on drums, and Linda Ronstadt and James Taylor on background vocals. The fact that this is the same line-up that recorded "Heart of Gold" and "Old Man" strongly suggests that this version was recorded as part of the Harvest sessions on February 6–7, 1971.

"Bad Fog of Loneliness" has much in common with much of what Young was writing at the time. The riff in the introduction is reminiscent of that of "The Needle and the Damage Done", and the change from 4/4 to 3/4 time in the bridge is similar to what he does in "Words (Between the Lines of Age)".

Songs about loneliness
Neil Young songs
1971 songs
Songs written by Neil Young
Song recordings produced by Neil Young
Song recordings produced by David Briggs (record producer)